Grégory Monro (born September 10, 1975) is a French filmmaker, writer and actor.

History
Born in Paris where he currently lives, he grew up with American culture, watching films by his favorite directors, Steven Spielberg, Alfred Hitchcock, Stanley Kubrick, Frank Capra, Sergio Leone.  But it was French comedian Louis de Funès who is responsible for Monro's passion, when he discovered his films as a child. As a consequence, he started acting at age 9 before making his first films at 13. After graduating from French Film School ESRA, in 1997, he attended Jack Waltzer's (a lifetime Actors Studio member) masterclass for a few years in Paris and New York. 
From 1999, Grégory Monro has written, produced, performed and directed several professional short films, most of which toured international film festivals such as Toronto, Palm Beach, Bolzano and South Korea.

Monro has a passion for the American West history and its legends, and is particularly concerned with feminine conditions. He is a specialist on Calamity Jane and has prepared various works on her. He published a few books, created a special exhibit in Paris in 2010, directed a docudrama for European broadcaster Arte, and is currently working on a feature film. Prior to his Calamity works, he purchased Calamity Jane's controversial diary and letters in 2004, which led to his projects. Prior to his directings Grégory Monro has worked as a production manager for numerous commercials and music videos, including Ayo, Sepultura, The shoes and Hugh Coltman.

In recent years, Monro directed several biographical documentaries, amongst them "Louis de Funès Forever ", Calamity Jane : Wild West Legend " and " Jerry Lewis : The man behind the clown ", selected at the Telluride Film Festival, the Lumière Film Festival, and the Haifa International Film Festival. In 2019, his documentary Michel Legrand : Let the music play was nominated for an International Emmy Awards, as well as his latest film Kubrick by Kubrick, premiered in 2020 and in 2021 at the Tribeca Film Festival. Kubrick by Kubrick has been selected in numerous festivals like Karlovy Vary International Film Festival or Deauville American Film Festival. In 2021, Monro's Kubrick film has been awarded with an International Emmy Awards, a Rockie Awards at the Banff World Media Festival and at the Focal international Film Festival.

Filmography 
 2000 : Choose or lose (short)
 2001 : Destinées (short)
 2005 : Adagio (short)
 2005 : Behind (short)
 2013 : Rose or the mute liars (short)
 2013 : Louis de Funès forever (documentary)
 2014 : Calamity Jane : Wild West Legend (docudrama)
 2016 : Jerry Lewis : The man behind the clown (documentary)
 2017 : James Stewart, Robert Mitchum : The Two Faces Of America (documentary)
 2018 : Pierre Richard : The quiet one (documentary)
 2018 : Michel Legrand : Let the music play (documentary)
 2019 : Toulouse-Lautrec : Racing through life (documentary)
 2020 : Kubrick by Kubrick (documentary)
 2021 : Buffalo Bill : Showtime ! (documentary)
 2022 : Rosa Bonheur, mother nature (documentary)
 2022 : In the eyes of Elsa Triolet (documentary)
 2022 : Sean Connery vs James Bond (documentary)

Awards 

 Rose or the mute liars
 Molins Horror Film Festival 2013 : Jury's price

 Kubrick by Kubrick 
 International Emmy Awards 2021 : Best documentary Arts Programming
 BANFF World Media Festival 2021 : Rockie Award of the best documentary
 Focal International Festival 2021 : Best usage of archives for a documentary in arts

Nominations 
 Michel Legrand : Let the music play 
 International Emmy Awards 2019 : Arts programming

 Toulouse-Lautrec : Racing through life 
 Asolo Art Film Festival 2020 : Films sur l'art

 Kubrick by Kubrick 
 Chicago International Film Festival 2020 : Meilleur documentaire

Bibliography 
 Calamity Jane : Letters to her daughter (2007), Payot & Rivages
 Calamity Jane – Mémoires de l'ouest (2010), Hoëbeke 
 Les personnages dans Lucky Luke (2013), Historia, Le Point
 Calamity Jane, aventurière (2017), Amaterra

External links
 

1975 births
Living people
French film directors
French male film actors
French male television actors